The Jabberwock Review is a literary journal founded in 1980 and based at Mississippi State University.

The journal publishes poetry, fiction, nonfiction and art.  Recent notable contributors include poets Nicky Beer and Brian Barker and fiction writers Jacob M. Appel and Robert Parham.

Masthead
As of November 2016:

 Editor:  Becky Hagenston
 Associate Editor:  Ciera Higginbotham

See also 
List of literary magazines

Notes

External links
Jabberwock Review official web site

Literary magazines published in the United States
Quarterly magazines published in the United States
Mississippi culture
Mississippi State University
Magazines established in 1980
Biannual magazines published in the United States
Magazines published in Mississippi